Bazhluk (Kaitag: Баӏжулей; Dargwa: Бяжлуки) is a rural locality (a selo) in Varsitsky Selsoviet, Kaytagsky District, Republic of Dagestan, Russia. The population was 39 as of 2010.

Geography 
Bazhluk is located 28 km southwest of Madzhalis (the district's administrative centre) by road. Varsit, Shilyagi and Duregi are the nearest rural localities.

References 

Rural localities in Kaytagsky District